Khvajeh Nafas (also Romanized as Khvājeh Nafas and Khājeh Nafas) is a village in Jafarbay-ye Gharbi Rural District, Gomishan District, Torkaman County, Golestan Province, Iran. At the 2006 census, its population was 4,390, in 892 families.

References 

Populated places in Torkaman County